John Tuzo Wilson  (October 24, 1908 – April 15, 1993) was a Canadian geophysicist and geologist who achieved worldwide acclaim for his contributions to the theory of plate tectonics.

Plate tectonics is the scientific theory that the rigid outer layers of the Earth (crust and part of the upper mantle), the lithosphere, is broken up into around 13 pieces or "plates" that move independently over the weaker asthenosphere. Wilson maintained that the Hawaiian Islands were created as a tectonic plate (extending across much of the Pacific Ocean) shifted to the northwest over a fixed hotspot, spawning a long series of volcanoes. He also conceived of the transform fault, a major plate boundary where two plates move past each other horizontally (e.g., the San Andreas Fault). 

His name was given to two young Canadian submarine volcanoes called the Tuzo Wilson Seamounts. The Wilson cycle of seabed expansion and contraction (associated with the Supercontinent cycle) bears his name.

Early life and education

Wilson was born in Ottawa on October 24, 1908, the son of John Armistead Wilson CBE, and his wife, Henrietta Tuzo. Wilson's father was of Scottish descent and his mother was a third-generation Canadian of French descent.

He became one of the first people in Canada to receive a degree in geophysics, graduating from Trinity College at the University of Toronto in 1930. He obtained a second (BA) degree from St. John's College, Cambridge in 1932 and then a doctorate (ScD). He then pursued further graduate studies as Princeton University, where he received a Ph.D. in geology in 1936 after completing a doctoral dissertation titled "The Geology of the Mill creek - Stillwater Area, Montana."

Career
In 1936, Wilson joined the Geological Survey of Canada as a government geologist. This was interrupted by the Second World War during which he served with the Royal Canadian Engineers, serving in Europe and reaching the rank of Colonel. He was involved in Operation Musk Ox.

In 1946 he was appointed the first Professor of Geophysics at the University of Toronto.

He made significant contributions to the theory of Plate tectonics, adding a concept of hot spots. Plate tectonics is the scientific theory that the rigid outer layers of the Earth (crust and part of the upper mantle), the lithosphere, is broken up into around 13 pieces or "plates" that move independently over the weaker asthenosphere. Wilson maintained that the Hawaiian Islands were created as a tectonic plate (extending across much of the Pacific Ocean) shifted to the northwest over a fixed hotspot, spawning a long series of volcanoes. He also conceived of the transform fault, a major plate boundary where two plates move past each other horizontally (e.g., the San Andreas Fault).

The Wilson cycle of seabed expansion and contraction (associated with the Supercontinent cycle) bears his name, in recognition of his iconic observation that the present-day Atlantic Ocean appears along a former suture zone and his development in a classic 1968 paper of what was later named the "Wilson cycle" in 1975 by Kevin C. A. Burke, a colleague and friend of Wilson.

His name was given to two young Canadian submarine volcanoes called the Tuzo Wilson Seamounts.

Wilson was president (1957–1960) of the International Union of Geodesy and Geophysics (IUGG). 

In 1967 he became principal of Erindale College, now known as University of Toronto Mississauga. In 1974 he left to become the Director General of the Ontario Science Centre. In 1983 he became Chancellor of York University, Toronto.

He was the host of the television series The Planet of Man.

Honours and awards
In 1969, he was made an Officer of the Order of Canada and was promoted to the rank of Companion of that order in 1974. He was elected to the American Academy of Arts and Sciences in 1971 and the American Philosophical Society in 1971. Wilson was awarded the John J. Carty Award from the National Academy of Sciences, of which he was already a member,  in 1975. In 1978, he was awarded the Wollaston Medal of the Geological Society of London and a Gold Medal by the Royal Canadian Geographical Society. He also served as honorary vice president of the RCGS. He was a Fellow of the Royal Society, the Royal Society of Canada, and of the Royal Society of Edinburgh. 

He was elected president-elect (1978–1980) and president (1980–1982) of the American Geophysical Union.
He also served as the director general of the Ontario Science Centre from 1974 to 1985. 

Wilson and his plate tectonic theory are commemorated on the grounds of the Centre by a giant "immovable" spike that records the amount of plate movement since Wilson's birth.

The J. Tuzo Wilson Medal of the Canadian Geophysical Union recognizes achievements in geophysics. He is also commemorated by a named memorial professorship and an eponymous annual public lecture delivered at the University of Toronto.

He is one of the 2016 inductees into Legends Row: Mississauga Walk of Fame.

Personal life

Photography
Wilson was an avid traveller and took a large number of photographs during his travels to many destinations, including European countries, parts of the then USSR, China, the southern Pacific, Africa, and to both polar regions.  Although many of his photos are geological—details of rocks and their structures or panoramas of large formations—the bulk of his photos are of the places, activities and people that he saw on his travels: landscapes, city views, monuments, sites, instruments, vehicles, flora and fauna, occupations and people.

Family
In 1938 he married Isabel Jean Dickson.

He retired in 1986 and died in Toronto on April 15, 1993.

Selected publications
One Chinese Moon (1959)

See also
List of geophysicists
Science and technology in Canada

References

External links

 The life of John Tuzo Wilson, history pages, Department of Physics, University of Toronto.
The Tuzo Wilson Lecture, an annual public lecture given at the University of Toronto.
The J. Tuzo Wilson Professorship, a named memorial professorship at the University of Toronto.
 Travel Photographs of J. Tuzo Wilson
 John Tuzo Wilson archival papers held at the University of Toronto Archives and Records Management Services
 Watch Tuzo Wilson in the 

1908 births
1993 deaths
Military personnel from Ottawa
Royal Canadian Engineers officers
Presidents of the Canadian Geophysical Union
Alumni of St John's College, Cambridge
20th-century Canadian geologists
Tectonicists
Chancellors of York University
Companions of the Order of Canada
Canadian geophysicists
Wilson Medal recipients
Fellows of the Royal Society of Canada
Canadian Fellows of the Royal Society
Fellows of the Royal Society of Edinburgh
Foreign associates of the National Academy of Sciences
Canadian Officers of the Order of the British Empire
Foreign recipients of the Legion of Merit
Penrose Medal winners
University of Toronto alumni
Trinity College (Canada) alumni
Princeton University alumni
Logan Medal recipients
Wollaston Medal winners
Sandford Fleming Award recipients
Canadian Army personnel of World War II
Presidents of the International Union of Geodesy and Geophysics
Members of the Royal Swedish Academy of Sciences
Members of the American Philosophical Society